Toxic positivity or positive toxicity is dysfunctional emotional management without the full acknowledgment of negative emotions, particularly anger and sadness.

Definition
It is a "pressure to stay upbeat no matter how dire one's circumstance is", which may prevent emotional coping by feeling otherwise natural emotions. Toxic positivity happens when people believe that negative thoughts about anything should be avoided. Even in response to events which normally would evoke sadness, such as loss or hardships, positivity is encouraged as a means to cope, but tends to overlook and dismiss true expression.

Psychology 
In one sense, toxic positivity is a construct in psychology about how to handle human emotions that is built upon the assumption that positive and negative emotions should match the appropriate situation. This is viewed as healthy psychologically. However, toxic positivity is criticized for its requirement to feel positive all the time, even when reality is negative. In her 2022 book, Bittersweet: How Sorrow and Longing Make Us Whole, author Susan Cain describes "tyranny of positivity" or "toxic positivity" as a cultural directive that says, "Whatever you do, don't tell the truth of what it's like to be alive".

Cain said that, historically and especially in the nineteenth century, boom-and-bust cycles led not only to reverence for successful businessmen, but also to attributing lack of success not to external circumstance but to a failure of character. Cain documents this perceived failure of character as being reflected in the evolving definition of the term "loser". The result is a culture with a "positivity mandate"—an imperative to act "unfailingly cheerful and positive, ... like a winner".

Positivity is generally seen as a good and helpful attitude for most situations, because it reflects optimism and gratitude and it can help lighten moods. Toxic positivity arises from an unrealistic expectation of having perfectly happy lives all the time. When this does not happen, people "can feel shame or guilt" by being unable to attain the perfection desired. Accordingly, positivity becomes toxic when a person rejects negative feelings even when they are appropriate.

People with a constant requirement for positive experiences may be inadvertently stigmatizing their own negative emotions, such as depression, or suppressing natural emotional responses, such as sadness, regret, or stress. Accepting negative emotions can make a person happier and healthier overall. Some authors, such as Kimberley Harrington, see toxic positivity as a form of personal emotional gaslighting. Harrington believes that it is fine to be "sad when you're sad and angry when you're angry" and to fully feel one's "rainbow of feelings".

Uncontrollable and controllable situations are important determinants of positivity. If the situation is controllable, artificially positive thinking can thwart a person's ability to fix the negative situation. Another determinant is the person's attitude toward happiness which may prevent an optimal response to the inevitable negative experiences that life brings. Positivity becomes toxic with the inability to examine and fix past mistakes. To gloss over inevitable mistakes with exaggerated confidence is unhelpful because it prevents learning from mistakes.  Social media such as LinkedIn, Instagram, or Facebook may exacerbate the problem as it often emphasizes positive experiences and discourages coping with the inevitable downsides.

Critics of Positive psychology have suggested that too much importance is placed on "upbeat thinking, while shunting challenging and difficult experiences to the side". Finally, by not allowing negative emotions, toxic positivity may result in physical consequences, such as cardiovascular and respiratory disease.

The concept of "tragic optimism", a phrase coined by the existential-humanistic psychologist and Holocaust survivor Viktor Frankl, has been suggested as an antidote.

References

Psychological concepts
Emotional intelligence
Positive psychology
Conformity